Isabella Rodriguez better known as Isabella Lovestory (born November 30, 1993) is a Honduran pop and reggaeton singer based in Montreal, Canada. Her music has been described as perreo-pop. She has collaborated with Mura Masa and has played at the Pop Montreal festival. She released her debut single in 2019, and her debut album Amor Hardcore in 2022, with production from her main collaborator Chicken. The album was recognized in various music and culture publications.

She moved to the United States in her adolescence, which she described as a culture shock, before moving to Montreal a few years later. She initially enrolled in art school, but found its rules and structures dissatisfying. She initially started recording music for her cat, first recording in 2018.

Lovestory's music reflects themes of self-expression and women's empowerment. Rodriguez commented that Lovestory is a persona, and enjoys exaggerating her personality and having fun through the character. Lovestory's character embraces her own sexual objectification and commented: "Mocking men is fun. Mocking what society views as degrading to women is fun, because nobody gets to decide what a woman's true desires are."

Discography

Studio albums

Extended plays

References 

Living people
Honduran singers
Reggaeton musicians
Year of birth missing (living people)